Valeriu "Sony" Niculescu (25 January 1914 – 18 November 1986) was a Romanian football striker.

Honours

Club
Unirea Tricolor București
Divizia A: 1940–41
Cupa României runner-up: 1940–41

Individual
Total matches played in Romanian First League: 106 matches – 78 goals
Topscorer of Romanian First League: 1940–41

Notes 
 The Divizia A 1940–41 was the last season before World War II and the Divizia A 1946–47 was the first one after, so the appearances and goals scored during this period for Unirea Tricolor București, Lares București and Ciocanul București are not official.

References

External links

1914 births
1986 deaths
Sportspeople from Brăila
Romanian footballers
Romania international footballers
Liga I players
Liga II players
Unirea Tricolor București players
FC Petrolul Ploiești players
Maccabi București players
Association football forwards